Roberto Lozano Montero (born 4 June 1977) is a Spanish former professional road cyclist.

Major results
2003
 1st Circuito de Getxo
2004
 Volta a Tarragona
1st Points classification
1st Stages 3 & 4
 2nd Overall Tour of Japan
1st Stages 3 & 5

References

External links

1977 births
Living people
Spanish male cyclists
Cyclists from Catalonia
People from Anoia
Sportspeople from the Province of Barcelona
20th-century Spanish people
21st-century Spanish people